Omar Colley (born 24 October 1992) is a Gambian professional footballer who plays as a defender for Turkish club Beşiktaş and the Gambia national team.

Club career

Gambian clubs
Colley started out playing youth football with Wallidan FC who are a part of his home country's top flight GFA League First Division. After he started playing for the first team he trialed with Major League Soccer club Sporting Kansas City on two occasions in 2010 and 2011. The Americans wanted to sign Colley but refused to pay any form of transfer fee or training compensation to his Gambian club. Wallidans founder called their offer "out of touch with modern football" and "an insult to the local clubs" so Colley instead moved to Real de Banjul where he helped the team become Gambian champions in 2012.

KuPS
In January 2013, he signed a two-year contract with KuPS. During the time between his two seasons in Finland he trialed with a couple of 2. Bundesliga clubs and Arminia Bielefeld made an offer to buy Colley. An agreement was not reached however as they could not agree on the transfer fee. As his contract with the Finnish club was nearing the end Colley was described as "perhaps our best foreign signing ever" by the KuPS club president.

Djurgårdens IF and Genk
In August 2014, Colley signed a three-year contract with Swedish side Djurgårdens IF, starting the first of January 2015. He played his debut game for the club on 22 February 2015 against Ängelholms FF in the Swedish Cup. On 12 August 2016, Colley travelled to Belgium to complete a medical with top-tier club K.R.C. Genk and by doing that Colley missed the training session ahead of the match versus IF Elfsborg which was against the will of Djurgården. Later that day the Director of Sport of Djurgården Bo Andersson told the football site Fotbollskanalen.se that Djurgården were prepared to take the case to FIFA due to the fact that Genk without the permission and knowledge of Djurgården booked a flight and hotel for Colley which violated the contract between Colley and Djurgården. Andersson stated that Djurgården would refuse to sell Colley to Genk after that incident. On 14 August, Colley started the match against IF Elfsborg on the bench due to the recent event. The following day Colley was sold to Genk despite the promise not to sell Colley to Genk. The transfer sum was reported by the Swedish newspaper Expressen to be €2 million and a resale clause which would make Colley the third most expensive defender ever sold by an Allsvenskan team after former Djurgården player Daniel Amartey and IF Elfsborg player Jon Jönsson.

Sampdoria 
On 19 June 2018, he signed for Italian club Sampdoria.

Beşiktaş 
On 9 February 2023, Turkish club Beşiktaş announced the signing of Colley to a contract until the end of the 2024–25 season, with a conditional one-year extension option based on performance. The transfer fee announced was 2.3 million euros.

International career
Colley was part of the Gambia national under-17 football team that won the 2009 African U-17 Championship as well as the Gambia national under-20 football team that played in the 2011 African Youth Championship. In 2012, he made his debut for the senior Gambia national team in a friendly game against Angola.
He played in the 2021 Africa cup of Nations, his national team's first continental tournament, where they made a sensational quarter-final.

Personal life
Colley is a Muslim. He made the umrah to Mecca in 2018 with then-Genk teammate Mbwana Samatta.

Honours
Gambia U17
African U-17 Championship: 2009

References

External links

1992 births
Sportspeople from Banjul
Gambian Muslims
Living people
Gambian footballers
The Gambia youth international footballers
The Gambia international footballers
Association football defenders
Wallidan FC players
Real de Banjul FC players
Kuopion Palloseura players
Djurgårdens IF Fotboll players
K.R.C. Genk players
U.C. Sampdoria players
Beşiktaş J.K. footballers
Veikkausliiga players
Allsvenskan players
Belgian Pro League players
Serie A players
2021 Africa Cup of Nations players
Gambian expatriate footballers
Expatriate footballers in Finland
Gambian expatriate sportspeople in Finland
Expatriate footballers in Sweden
Gambian expatriate sportspeople in Sweden
Expatriate footballers in Belgium
Gambian expatriate sportspeople in Belgium
Expatriate footballers in Italy
Gambian expatriate sportspeople in Italy
Expatriate footballers in Turkey
Gambian expatriate sportspeople in Turkey